National Institute of (the) Arts may refer to:
Instituto Universitario Nacional del Arte
National Institute of Arts and Letters
National Institute of Arts, Kinshasa
National Taiwan University of Arts
Taipei National University of the Arts

Institut Seni Indonesia (Indonesian: Institute of the Arts of Indonesia) can refer to three institutes:

Indonesian Institute of the Arts, Denpasar
Indonesian Institute of the Arts, Surakarta (formerly Sekolah Tinggi Seni Indonesia Surakarta)
Indonesian Institute of the Arts, Yogyakarta

See also
Sekolah Tinggi Seni Indonesia (disambiguation)
SMKI (disambiguation)